The 2013 Piala Malaysia group stage featured 16 teams.
The teams were drawn into fourth groups of four, and played each other home-and-away in a round-robin format. The top two teams in each group advanced to the 2013 Piala Malaysia quarter finals.

Groups
The matchdays were 20–31 August, and 17–21 September 2013.

Group A

Group B

Group C

Group D

Goals

9 goals
 Marlon Alex James (ATM FA)

8 goals
 Matías Conti (Pahang FA)

7 goals

 Patrick Wleh (PKNS FC)
 Muamer Salibašić (Sarawak FA)

6 goals
 Dickson Nwakaeme (Kelantan FA)

5 goals

 Indra Putra Mahayuddin (Kelantan FA)
 Mohd Badri Radzi (Kelantan FA)
 Fabio Barbosa (Negeri Sembilan FA)
 S. Sivanesan (Negeri Sembilan FA)
 Mohd Azamuddin Akil (Pahang FA)

4 goals

 Norshahrul Idlan Talaha (Johor Darul Takzim FC)
 Alen Guć (Kedah FA)
 Roman Chmelo (PKNS FC)
 Bobby Gonzales (Sarawak FA)
 Karlo Primorac (Sime Darby FC)

3 goals

 D. Christie Jayaseelan (ATM FA)
 Mohd Safee Sali (Johor Darul Takzim FC)
 Mohd Farid Ideris (Johor FA)
 Mohd Nor Farhan Muhammad (Kelantan FA)
 R. Gopinathan (Pahang FA)
 Mohd Fazrul Hazli Mohd Kadri (Sime Darby FC)
 Mohd Ashaari Shamsuddin (Terengganu FA)
 Ahmad Syamim Yahaya (T-Team FC)

2 goals

 Bruno Martelotto (ATM FA)
 Irwan Fadzli Idrus (ATM FA)
 Rudie Ramli (FELDA United F.C.)
 Hadin Azman (Johor Darul Takzim FC)
 Mohd Nurul Azwan Roya (Johor Darul Takzim FC)
 Mohd Safiq Rahim (Johor Darul Takzim FC)
 Mohd Izuan Jarudin (Johor FA)
 Ahmad Fakri Saarani (Kelantan FA)
 Obinna Nwaneri (Kelantan FA)
 Hafiz Abu Sujad (LionsXII)
 Hariss Harun (LionsXII)
 Safuwan Baharudin (LionsXII)
 Paulo Rangel (Perak FA)
 Joseph Kalang Tie (Sarawak FA)
 Zamri Morshidi (Sarawak FA)
 Mohd Amri Yahyah (Selangor FA)
 S. Kunanlan (Selangor FA)
 Mohd Asrol Ibrahim (Sime Darby FC)
 Togaba Kontiwa Komlan (Sime Darby FC)
 Jean-Emmanuel Effa Owona (Terengganu FA)
 George Boateng (T-Team FC)

1 goals

 Amirizwan Taj Tajuddin (ATM FA)
 Hairuddin Omar (ATM FA)
 Mohd Fitri Omar (ATM FA)
 Muhammad Shukor Adan (ATM FA)
 Venice Elphi Danny Kaya (ATM FA)
 Emmanuel Mazuwa (FELDA United F.C.)
 Mohd Akmal Mohd Noor (FELDA United F.C.)
 Jasazrin Jamaluddin (Johor Darul Takzim FC)
 Leonel Núñez (Johor Darul Takzim FC)
 Mohd Ezaidy Khadar (Johor FA)
 Mohd Hairul Nizam Haniff (Johor FA)
 Mohd Khairul Ismail (Johor FA)
 Mohd Rasyid Aya (Johor FA)
 Nelson San Martín (Kedah FA)
 Zairo Anuar Zalani (Kelantan FA)
 Baihakki Khaizan (LionsXII)
 Fazrul Nawaz (LionsXII)
 Madhu Mohana (LionsXII)
 Shahril Ishak (LionsXII)
 Shahfiq Ghani (LionsXII)
 Mohd Nazrin Mohd Nawi (Negeri Sembilan FA)
 Damion Stewart (Pahang FA)
 Azidan Sarudin (Pahang FA)
 Mohd Amirul Hadi Zainal (Pahang FA)
 Mohd Fauzi Roslan (Pahang FA)
 Azlan Ismail (Perak FA)
 Khairul Asyraf Shaizah (Perak FA)
 Yong Kuong Yong (Perak FA)
 Mohd Noor Hazrul Mohd Mustafa (Perak FA)
 Mohd Lot Abu Hassan (PKNS FC)
 Mohd Nizad Ayub (PKNS FC)
 Muhd Khairu Azrin Khazali (PKNS FC)
 Reeshafiq Alwi (PKNS FC)
 Mohd Shahrol Saperi (Sarawak FA)
 Francis Forkey Doe (Selangor FA)
 Mohd Fitri Shazwan Raduwan (Selangor FA)
 Azmirul Azmi (Sime Darby FC)
 Hadzirun Che Hamid (Sime Darby FC)
 Khairul Ramadhan Zauwawi (Terengganu FA)
 Abdul Latiff Suhaimi (T-Team FC)
 Fazuan Abdullah (T-Team FC)

Own goal
 Mohd Khairi Kiman from (Perak FA) score for Sarawak FA
 Hasmizan Kamarodin from (Terengganu FA) score for Kelantan FA
 Hariss Harun from (LionsXII) score for ATM FA
 Shakir Hamzah from (LionsXII) score for Sarawak FA

References

External links
2013 Piala Malaysia, SPMB

2013 in Malaysian football
Malaysia Cup seasons